Bealu Girma (22 September 1939 – 1984) was an Ethiopian journalist known for his criticism of prominent members of the Derg, in his book Oromay ("The End"). Girma disappeared in 1984, and it is widely believed he was abducted and killed by the Derg for his critical writings.

Early life 

Baalu Girma was born on 22 September 1939, in the Illubabor Province, Ethiopia. His father was an Indian businessman, and his mother a local woman born to a wealthy family. His parents’ marriage ended when his father decided to move his family to Addis Ababa, and his mother’s family refused to permit them to leave. After the separation, Baalu's father continued to provide for his son; but Baalu never managed to develop a strong relationship with his father. In college, he changed his last name to Girma, after a family who took him in as their own and gave him love and care throughout his childhood in Addis.

Aside from being very close to his maternal grandfather and having some loving memories of one particular teacher, Baalu rarely talked about his childhood in Illubabor. After he completed traditional Ethiopian schooling as a child, he moved to Addis Ababa and became a boarding student at the Zenebe Worq Elementary School.

Although he was academically very bright, as a youngster, he was also known for being a bit of a troublemaker. In fact, he was known to organize a school-wide protest in order to get his wishes.

Girma's excellent grades earned him a scholarship at General Wingate Secondary School. In 1951, he entered General Wingate, and it was there that he found his calling in journalism and creative writing. He often thanked his English teacher, Miss Marshall, for inspiring him and teaching him the technique of writing short sentences.

College 

In 1962, Girma earned a bachelor's degree in Political Science and Journalism from Addis Ababa University. As an undergraduate, he mixed academic excellence with the practice of journalism. He served as a news correspondent for the Ethiopian Herald (a prominent English-language newspaper) and as editor-in-chief of News and Views, a well-known university newspaper. As a young editor, he was often critical of the emperor's administration and his government’s policies, which at times forced Girma to interrupt his school and go into hiding.

Despite these challenges, Girma earned a full scholarship and obtained a master's degree in Political Science and Journalism from Michigan State University, East Lansing, Michigan.

Professional career 

Late in 1963, Girma returned to Ethiopia and began his career in the Ministry of Information as Editor-in- Chief of Ye'Zareyitu Ethiopia, a weekly newspaper published in the Amharic language.
In 1965, he was appointed editor-in-chief of Addis Reporter, a weekly magazine published in English. After three years, Girma left the Addis Reporter and became editor of the Ethiopian Herald, a daily English-language newspaper.

The early stage of his professional life did not go without incidents. Once he was suspended from his editorship role over a controversial editorial he had written in Addis Reporter, a weekly magazine published in the English language. Later, when returned to work, he had to accept a salary cut.

From 1970 to 1974, Girma served as Editor-in-Chief of Addis Zemen, a mainstream daily newspaper published in Amharic. During the country-wide violence and profound political change in 1974, Addis Zemen, under Girma's editorship, remained the only unbiased and trusted source of information.

While he was the editor-in-chief of Addis Zemen, Girma also wrote two of his most popular novels, Kadmas Bashager (Beyond the Horizon) and Ye'hillina Dewel (The Bell of Conscience). Girma is also known for his 1983 Amharic novel Oromay.

In 1974, Girma left Addis Zemen and became Deputy General Manager of the Ethiopian News Agency. Within a year, he was promoted to the General Manager position and remained in that post until 1977. At the end of 1977, he became the Permanent Secretary of the Ministry of Information.
In addition to being a journalist and writer, Girma served as guest lecturer of creative writing at Addis Ababa University.

Disappearance 
Family members found Baalu Girma's car outside of Addis Ababa on the way to Bishoftu. The military junta classified him as a missing person and no one has heard from Girma since.

Along with his wife, Almaz Aberra, Girma is survived by his daughter, Meskerem, his sons, Zelalem and Kibre, and his granddaughter, Naomi-Baalu Gizaw.

See also
List of people who disappeared

References

Books

External links 

Baalu Girma Foundation
Biography at Baalu Girma Foundation
In Memoriam

20th-century journalists
20th-century novelists
1939 births
1980s missing person cases
1984 deaths
Ethiopian journalists
Ethiopian novelists
Missing people
Missing person cases in Africa